20 Forthlin Road is a National Trust property in Allerton in south Liverpool, Merseyside, England. It is the house in which Paul McCartney lived for several years before he rose to fame with the Beatles, and it is labelled by the National Trust as "the birthplace of the Beatles". It was also the home of his brother Mike and  the birthplace of the trio the Scaffold, of which Mike was a member.

History 
The house was built in 1949 and owned by the local authority, and the McCartney family moved into it in 1955 when Paul was at secondary school.

In 1965, Paul bought his father Jim a house in Heswall, a wealthy part of the Wirral.

The house has been in the ownership of the National Trust since 1995. The Trust markets the house as "the birthplace of the Beatles", since this is the place where the Beatles composed and rehearsed their earliest songs.

Unlike Lennon's childhood home, 20 Forthlin Road does not have an English Heritage blue plaque and is currently ineligible to receive one. English Heritage issue a plaque once the figure has "been dead for 20 years, or has passed the centenary of their birth".

In February 2012, both this house and Lennon's childhood home at 251 Menlove Avenue were Grade II listed by Historic England.

The home was featured in an edition of Carpool Karaoke, which aired on the 22 June 2018, episode of The Late Late Show with James Corden.  Corden visited there with Paul McCartney, who said it was his first visit to the home since he moved away in his late teens.

See also 
Mendips – childhood home of John Lennon; another National Trust property
12 Arnold Grove – birthplace of George Harrison
10 Admiral Grove – Ringo Starr's childhood home

References

External links

 The Beatles' Childhood Homes – National Trust, includes 20 Forthlin Road and Mendips

Biographical museums in Merseyside
Grade II listed buildings in Liverpool
Grade II listed houses
Historic house museums in Merseyside
History of the Beatles
Houses in Merseyside

Music museums in Liverpool
National Trust properties in Merseyside